Jeff Miller may refer to:

Jeff Miller (California politician) (born 1963), member of the California State Assembly
Jeff Miller (Florida politician) (born 1959), U.S. Representative from Florida's 1st congressional district
Jeff Miller (American businessman) (born 1964), CEO and Chairman of the Board of Halliburton
Jeff Miller (Tennessee politician) (born 1962), Republican member of the Tennessee Senate
Jeff Miller (rugby union) (born 1962), Australian rugby union player
Jeff Miller (writer) (born 1979), Canadian zine publisher and writer
Jeff Miller (Lassie), a fictional character in the long-running television series Lassie

See also
Jeff Millar (1942–2012), American cartoonist and film critic
Jeffrey Miller (disambiguation)
Geoffrey Miller (disambiguation)